Donald Harold Saklofske is a Canadian psychologist and professor in the Department of Psychology at the University of Western Ontario. He is a former president of the International Society for the Study of Individual Differences and the current editor-in-chief of its official journal, Personality and Individual Differences. He is also editor-in-chief of the Journal of Psychoeducational Assessment. He is a fellow of the Association for Psychological Science, the Canadian Psychological Association, and the Society for Personality and Social Psychology.

References

External links
Faculty page

Canadian psychologists
Living people
Academic staff of the University of Western Ontario
University of Calgary alumni
Differential psychologists
Academic journal editors
Fellows of the Association for Psychological Science
Year of birth missing (living people)